Dolga Njiva pri Šentlovrencu ( or ) is a small village north of Šentlovrenc in the Municipality of Trebnje in eastern Slovenia. The area is part of the historical Lower Carniola region. The municipality is now included in the Southeast Slovenia Statistical Region.

Name
The name of the settlement was changed from Dolga Njiva to Dolga Njiva pri Šentlovrencu in 1953.

Church
A small church in the settlement is dedicated to the Finding of the Holy Cross and belongs to the Parish of Šentlovrenc. It is a medieval building and contains fragments of 16th-century frescos in the nave.

References

External links
Dolga Njiva pri Šentlovrencu at Geopedia

Populated places in the Municipality of Trebnje